The Western Champion was a newspaper published initially in Blackall and later in nearby Barcaldine, Queensland, Australia.

History
The newspaper was initially published under the name The Western Champion from 1879 to 1891 by J. Monahan and William Henry Campbell.

The newspaper was published under the name The Western Champion and General Advertiser for the Central-Western Districts from 1892 to 1922 by William Henry Campbell, Charles John James and Frederic Robert James.

The newspaper was published under the name The Western Champion from 1922 to 1937 by William Henry Campbell, Charles John James and Frederic Robert James.

Digitisation 
The papers have been digitised as part of the Australian Newspapers Digitisation Program  of the National Library of Australia.

References

External links
 
 
 

Western Champion
Blackall, Queensland
Barcaldine, Queensland
1879 establishments in Australia
Publications established in 1879